Pine Ridge Mall is an enclosed shopping mall located in Chubbuck, Idaho, near Interstate 86. The mall was developed by Price Development Corporation and opened in 1981. The mall is currently owned by Farmer Holding Co. and the anchor tenants are C-A-L Ranch Stores, Gem Prep, Hobby Lobby, JCPenney, and Planet Fitness.

History
Pine Ridge Mall opened in 1981 with The Bon Marché, JCPenney, and ZCMI as anchor stores. An expansion in the 1990s added Sears, which moved from the now-demolished Pocatello Mall, and Shopko. 

In 2001, Dillard's acquired four ZCMI stores, including the Pine Ridge Mall location. Dillard's closed in 2008 and was replaced by Herberger's in 2012. 

In 2005, The Bon Marché was rebranded as Macy's and, in August 2006, was closed. The Macy's building was briefly occupied by Party Palace, before C-A-L Ranch Stores opened in the space in 2014.

In November 2013, General Growth Properties sold the mall to Farmer Holding Co. for $9.05 million. In August 2014, Sears announced that they will be closing their store in the mall in November 2014. A Hobby Lobby store was added to mall in September 2016. On January 31, 2018, The Bon-Ton announced that Herberger's would also be closing in April 2018 as part of a plan to close 42 stores nationwide. Planet Fitness opened in a portion of the vacant Herberger's store in January 2019. On January 17, 2019, it was announced that Gem Prep, a charter school, would be open the former Sears in summer 2019. On February 6, 2019, Shopko announced that it would be closing as well as part of a plan to close 251 stores nationwide. The store closed in May 2019. In 2022, C-A-L Ranch Stores will relocate from its current location in the mall to a portion of the Shopko building.

References

External links

Shopping malls in Idaho
Shopping malls established in 1981
Buildings and structures in Bannock County, Idaho
Pocatello, Idaho metropolitan area